The Hackleman Historic District in Albany Oregon, was placed on the list of National Register of Historic Places (NRHP) in 1982. The district contains 228 historic properties within about a 28 city blocks area. The district was named after Abner Hackleman who came to Albany in 1845.

See also 
 National Register of Historic Places listings in Linn County, Oregon
 George Earle Chamberlain House (Albany, Oregon)

References

Culture of Albany, Oregon
Historic districts on the National Register of Historic Places in Oregon
National Register of Historic Places in Linn County, Oregon
1982 establishments in Oregon